Motörhead were a British heavy metal band from London. Formed in 1975, the group originally featured former Hawkwind bassist and vocalist Ian "Lemmy" Kilmister, former Pink Fairies guitarist and vocalist Larry Wallis, and drummer Lucas Fox. The band went through several lineup changes, before settling on its final incarnation of Lemmy, guitarist Phil Campbell and drummer Mikkey Dee in 1995. Motörhead disbanded upon Lemmy's death on 28 December 2015.

History

1975–1982
Bassist and vocalist Ian "Lemmy" Kilmister was sacked from space rock group Hawkwind in May 1975, after he was arrested for suspected possession of cocaine (later determined to be amphetamines) during a North American concert tour. After moving back to London, Lemmy quickly formed Motörhead (named after the final song he wrote for Hawkwind) with guitarist Larry Wallis and drummer Lucas Fox. By December, Fox had been replaced by Phil "Philthy Animal" Taylor after his performances had been deemed "unreliable" during early recording sessions. Taylor re-recorded all songs the band had tracked earlier (with the exception of "Lost Johnny", following an arrest which prevented him from being able to get to the studio in time), which were later issued in 1979 as On Parole.

In March 1976, Motörhead auditioned "Fast" Eddie Clarke, a friend of Taylor's, as an intended second guitarist; however, after rehearsing just one song as a four-piece, Wallis decided to leave and Clarke took over as the sole guitarist. The lineup of Lemmy, Clarke and Taylor became known as the "classic Motörhead lineup", releasing five successful studio albums between 1977 and 1982 including Ace of Spades. Prior to any of these releases, however, the group almost broke up in April 1977 due to poor reviews of their live shows and little to no interest from record companies. They remained together though, and their self-titled debut album followed in August.

1982–1995
After a string of successful releases, Clarke left Motörhead in May 1982 due to his disapproval with the recording of the EP Stand by Your Man with singer Wendy O. Williams. His place was soon taken by former Thin Lizzy guitarist Brian "Robbo" Robertson, initially to complete the touring cycle, after which he accepted a full-time role with the band. Robertson only remained for a year and a half, however, playing his last show on 11 November 1983 before leaving the band. In subsequent interviews, Lemmy claimed that working with Robertson on Another Perfect Day as "fucking torture", as well as criticising him for "dress[ing] like a cunt" on stage.

Motörhead became a quartet for the first time in their history at the beginning of 1984, when both Michael "Würzel" Burston and Phil "Wizzö" Campbell were hired to take over Robertson's place in the band, following a string of auditions. The new lineup recorded a new version of "Ace of Spades" for the TV series The Young Ones in February, after which Taylor also left the band. He was replaced by Pete Gill, formerly of Saxon. After recording four new tracks for the No Remorse compilation and issuing one full-length album, Orgasmatron, Phil Taylor returned to Motörhead in March 1987 to replace Gill, who left "by mutual agreement ... for business reasons". Lemmy would later claim that Gill had tried to get him fired from Motörhead.

With "Philthy Animal" Taylor back on drums, Motörhead released Rock 'n' Roll in 1987 and 1916 in 1991. After recording just one song for the band's 1992 follow-up March ör Die, however, he was fired, with Lemmy later explaining that "I would never have fired Phil if he had been pulling his weight, but he wasn't, and I couldn't make him do it." Much of the rest of the album's recording was completed by session drummer Tommy Aldridge, most recently departed from Whitesnake.

1995–2015

Towards the end of sessions for March ör Die, former King Diamond drummer Mikkey Dee was brought in to take over from Phil Taylor, initially on a temporary basis but soon as a permanent replacement. He featured only on the album's lead single, "Hellraiser". With Dee in place, Bastards and Sacrifice followed in quick succession. After the recording of the latter finished in early 1995, Motörhead went through its final lineup change when guitarist Würzel left the band, which Lemmy claimed "became clearer every day" during the sessions. Following his departure, Würzel was not replaced and Motörhead returned to their "classic" three-piece setup.

The lineup of Lemmy, Phil Campbell and Mikkey Dee remained constant from 1995 to 2015, the longest in the band's history. During summer 2003, Campbell was substituted at two shows by former Danzig guitarist Todd Youth after his mother had died, before joining him for a third date and performing as a four-piece. In September 2009, former Guns N' Roses and Velvet Revolver drummer Matt Sorum filled in for Dee, who took part in the Swedish TV show Kändisdjungeln. Lemmy later cited a "breakdown in communication" as the reason for Dee's absence, explaining that "Our management didn't know that he'd signed up for this when they booked the tour."

On 28 December 2015, Lemmy died of what was later revealed to be prostate cancer, cardiac arrhythmia and congestive heart failure. The next day, Mikkey Dee confirmed that "Motörhead is over, of course," adding that "Lemmy was Motörhead." Several other former members of the band have also died – Michael "Würzel" Burston on 9 July 2011, Phil "Philthy Animal" Taylor on 11 November 2015, "Fast" Eddie Clarke on 10 January 2018, and Larry Wallis on 19 September 2019.

Members

Official

Backup

Timeline

Lineups

References

External links
Motörhead official website

Motörhead